Wang Keping may refer to:
 Wang Keping (academic), Chinese professor of aesthetics and philosophy
 Wang Keping (artist), Chinese contemporary wood sculptor